Geoffrey Cornu (29 June 1913 – 29 June 2007) was an English first-class cricketer.

Born at Sheffield, Cornu was educated at Malvern College. He made his debut in first-class cricket for the Free Foresters against Oxford University at Oxford in 1934. He made four further appearances in first-class cricket for the Free Foresters, the last of which came in 1937 against Oxford University. Across his five matches, he scored a total of 60 runs with a highest score of 21 not out, while with the ball he took 13 wickets with his leg break googly bowling, coming at a bowling average of 39.46 and best innings figures of 3/92. Cornu served as a second lieutenant with the Royal Artillery during World War II. He died on his 94th birthday in 2007.

References

External links

1913 births
2007 deaths
Cricketers from Sheffield
People educated at Malvern College
English cricketers
Free Foresters cricketers
British Army personnel of World War II
Royal Artillery officers
Military personnel from Sheffield